Paper Tiger Television (PTTV) is a non-profit, low-budget public access television program and open media collective based in New York City. Currently operating from Brooklyn, PPTV was co-founded by media activist and Academy Award nominated documentary filmmaker Dee Dee Halleck in 1981. It focuses on raising media literacy and exists as a protest to corporate control over broadcast mediums.

Founded to promote freedom of speech and access to means of communication, the volunteer-run non-profit organization is a collective action in response to systems of hierarchical power.

The collective celebrated its 25th anniversary on October 11, 2007 with a premiere of the video Paper Tiger Reads Paper Tiger Television at the Anthology Film Archives. In 2018, in collaboration with Halleck's other collective, Deep Dish TV, Paper Tiger Television released a 10-part video series about resistance to the rise of far-right political movements.

History
Founded in part by Dee Dee Halleck, Paper Tiger Television grew out of the Public-access television series, Communications Update, which ran on Manhattan Cable TV. The first Paper Tiger programs featured communications scholar Herbert Schiller reading the New York Times, the "steering mechanism of the ruling class".

Aesthetic and themes 
Known for its democratic goals and anti-commercialism agenda, Paper Tiger Television is most widely recognized for incorporating a DIY visual style in its programming. The creators and reporters frequently made use of handmade signs, backdrops, and other unpolished set pieces which highlighted the grassroots tone of PPTV's videos and drew attention to the production process. For instance, one of their special live broadcasts begins with a lengthy introduction to PPTV's mission, with the text laid over a brightly colorful backdrop:"Our lives are increasingly influenced by the large corporations that make and distribute information. Their power rests on false assumptions. This legitimacy is a paper tiger. Investigation into the corporate structure of the media and critical analysis of their methods and meanings can be a way of demystifying the information industry. A critical consciousness about communications is necessary for cultural autonomy and democratic control of information resources."

Archived programs
The archives of Paper Tiger Television house one of the most culturally significant alternative media collections in American history, including critical components of the coinciding technological and artistic evolution of public access television, video art, video activism, and media reform. The complete catalog of over 500 programs can be found at the Paper Tiger Television website.

 Herb Schiller Reads The New York Times: The Steering Mechanism of the Ruling Class, 1981
 Natalie Didn't Drown: Joan Braderman Reads The National Enquirer, 1982
 Tuli Kupferberg Reads Rolling Stone: Always Smile When You Give 'em the Shaft, October 13, 1982
 Bill Tabb Reads US News & World Report: Disrobing the Economy, May 26, 1982
 Martha Rosler Reads Vogue: Wishing, Dreaming, Winning, Spending, Dec, 1982
 Archie Singham Reads Foreign Policy: A Look at the Old Boy's Network, May 4, 1983
 Joel Kovel Reads Life Magazine: It's a New Life, Painting a Corpse, September 21, 1983
 Stanley Aronowitz Reads The New York Times: A Timely Look at Labor, 1983
 Elayne Rapping Swoons to Romance Novels, 1983
 Richie Perez Watches Fort Apache: The Bronx, 1983
 Patty Zimmerman Reads Variety: Hooray for Hollywood, June 20, 1984
 Pearl Bowser Looks at Early Black Cinema: The Legacy of Oscar Micheaux, 1984
 Renee Tajima Reads Asian Images in American Film: Charlie Chan Go Home!, 1984
 Marc Crispin Miller Reads Cigarette Ads: Lots More Ifs, Ands & Butts, 1985
 Jean Franco Reads Mexican Novelas: Adios Machismo! Hola Maquilladora, 1985
 Flo Kennedy Reads U.S. Press on South Africa: The Hair in the Milk, February 1985
 Noam Chomsky Reads The New York Times: Seeking Peace in the Middle East, June 1985
 Thulani Davis Asks, Why Howard Beach?: Racial Violence and the Media, January 21, 1987 
 Donna Haraway Reads The National Geographic on Primates, 1987
 Born To Be Sold: Martha Rosler Reads the Strange Case of Baby S/M, 1988
 Fred Landis Reads The Washington Times: The Dark Side of the Moonies, 1989
 Class Dismissed: featuring Howard Zinn and James Loewen, 2004
 Stuart Ewen Reads The New York Post: Fantasy, Morality and Authority, 1982
 Protest + Education Can Equal Change: featuring Kathy High, 1992
 The Last Graduation: The Rise and Fall of College Programs in Prison, 1997

Cultural impact 
Since its launch in the early 1980s, Paper Tiger Television has influenced and supported grassroots media activist organizations by providing an innovative model for community media and spurring the global development of a do-it-yourself (DIY) community media movement. 

Among viewers, historians, scholars, and creative media makers, the early age of Paper Tiger Television is remembered for its radical political mission and irreverent, ultra-low-budget antics in emphasizing this mission. PPTV's engagement with critiques of mass culture and politics, and providing of innovative leadership for documentary filmmakers, artists, media literacy educators and social justice media movements around the world helped bring more attention to the potential powers of alternative media combined with the rising technology of broadcast television.

Many PPTV programs examine a particular aspect of the communications industry, from print media to TV to movies, looking at its impact on public perception and opinion. Other videos represent the people and views which are largely absent from the mainstream media. Cultural scholar Douglass Rushkoff describes the impact of PPTV as such:"Perhaps it was the voltage created by the potential difference between what was airing on the networks and what was actually going on around the country that gave Paper Tiger the burst of energy it needed to become a full-fledged force in national television during the Gulf War."Dee Dee Halleck, one of PPTV's founders, went on to launch Deep TV (now Deep Dish Satellite Network) in 1986, which was the first national independent satellite network.

See also
 Communications Update / Cast Iron TV
 Showdown in Seattle

References

DeeDee Halleck, Handheld Visions: The Impossible Possibilities of Community Media
Erik Barnouw, Documentary: A History of the Non-Fiction Film
Martha Gever, "Meet the Press: On Paper Tiger Television." in Transmission. Ed. Peter D'Augustino. New York: Tanam, 1985. 215–33.
Marcus, Daniel. "Paper Tiger Television (United States)." Encyclopedia of Social Movement Media, edited by John D. H. Downing, SAGE Reference, 2011, pp. 383–384. Gale Virtual Reference Library.
Stein, L. (2001). Access television and grassroots political communication in the United States. In J. H. Downing, Radical media: Rebellious communication and social movements (pp. 299–324). Thousand Oaks, CA: Sage.

External links
 Paper Tiger Television's Home Page
 Paper Tiger Bloggi-Vision Paper Tiger TV's Videoblog
 Paper Tiger Television Review 1992 exhibit at San Francisco Art Institute
 Dueling Dancers at Paper Tiger TV's 25 Year Anniversary Video clip of performance from 25 Year Anniversary
Paper Tiger Television in the Video Data Bank

Television organizations in the United States
1981 establishments in New York City
501(c)(3) organizations
Organizations established in 1981